Clash of the Gods is a one-hour weekly mythology television series that premiered on August 3, 2009 on the History channel. The program covers many of the ancient Greek and Norse Gods, monsters and heroes including Hades, Hercules, Medusa, Minotaur, Odysseus and Zeus.

Episodes

Home media
Clash of the Gods: The Complete Season 1 DVD Set was released on February 16, 2010. The Blu-ray version was released on March 16, 2010.

References
Clash of the Gods Episodes - Season 1

History (American TV channel) original programming
Ancient history
Mythology in popular culture
2000s American reality television series
2009 American television series debuts
2009 American television series endings
Television series based on classical mythology
Television series set in ancient Greece